ANITA (Analysing Interferometer for Ambient Air) is a trace gas monitoring system for the International Space Station ISS.
It is developed by OHB and SINTEF under contract of ESA.

Working principle
ANITA is based on Fourier-Transform-Infrared-Spectroscopy FTIR. Each measured gas absorbts light in a certain frequency, these spectral lines are analysed and a gas concentration is calculated.

Development
ANITA-1 was operating from Sept 2007 until Aug 2008 on board the ISS. It weighed >55kg which was distributed in 2 Middeck Locker Inserts and a Laptop. Power consumption was approx. 150W. It was able to measure more than 32 trace gases on board the ISS.

ANITA-2 launched on SpaceX CRS-24 in Dec. 2021. It has been significantly reduced in size (1 Middeck Locker Insert) and mass (<38kg). The total power consumption is approx. 80W. It features WiFi Connection and a Touch Screen for a more versatile use. Compared to ANITA-1 it has a significantly increased (~factor 4) Signal to Noise Ratio allowing lower detection limits. ANITA-2 is calibrated to detect 37 gases, mostly with a detection limit well below 1ppm. 
ANITA-2 was installed in an Express Rack inside the Destiny Lab by Matthias Maurer January 5, 2022. ANITA-2 is running  nearly continuously on board the ISS since March 2022 and is monitoring the gas environment.

Usage
Using ANITA-1 Freon 218 was able to be detected on board the ISS, which was probably leaking from a Russian cooling loop.

References

External links 
 Overview of the project ANITA-2 at the website of SINTEF

Space stations
Interferometers